Basanta Thapa (born 10 April 1977) is a Nepali former footballer who is last known to have played as a forward for MMC.

Career

Thapa is a former Nepal international. He won Player of the Martyrs' Memorial League 2061. He started his career with MMC.

In 2005, Thapa trialed for Japanese second tier side Avispa Fukuoka. He was called up for national team to play at the 2006 AFC Challenge Cup.

In 2001, he played for Bangladeshi club Brothers Union in the Dhaka Senior Division Football League, and scored 6 goals in the relegation play-offs in the league.

He has scored over 50 goals in the Nepal league. He was known for his goalscoring prowess.

References

1977 births
Living people
Nepalese footballers
Association football forwards
Nepal international footballers
Manang Marshyangdi Club players
Brothers Union players
Nepalese expatriate sportspeople in Bangladesh
Sportspeople from Kathmandu
South Asian Games medalists in football
South Asian Games silver medalists for Nepal